The Fabryka Samochodów Małolitrażowych, commonly known as FSM, was a Polish automobile factory born from an agreement between the FSO and Fiat in the 1970s for the construction of a new model, the Polski Fiat 126p, Polish version of Fiat 126. For the project a new manufacturing plant was opened in Tychy. The factory also produced until the beginning of the 1980s the FSO Syrena. The FSM brand was active between 1971 and 1992, when it was privatised and Fiat Group took control of it.

After the factory was renamed Fiat Auto Poland it produced Fiat Cinquecento and its successor Fiat Seicento. The last Polski Fiat 126p was made in 2000. All Cinquecentos, Seicentos and new Pandas were/are made in Poland. Fiat Auto Poland also produces the new Fiat 500.

Fiat Auto Poland's other plant at Bielsko-Biała, destined mainly to the construction of the mechanics, from 2002 has become center of the joint venture between Fiat Group and General Motors for the construction of the small 1.3-litre Multijet diesel engine.

Former production
Models that were produced at the Bielsko-Biała and Tychy factories (FSM and Fiat Auto Poland):
FSM Syrena 105/105L (1972–1983, Bielsko-Biała), 344,077 units produced
Polski Fiat 126p (1973–2000, Bielsko-Biała and Tychy), 3,318,674 units produced
Polski Fiat 126 BIS (1987–1991, Bielsko-Biała), a dual trunk hatchback version of the 126p - 190,361 units produced
FSM Cinquecento (1991-1992), Fiat Cinquecento (1991–1998, Tychy), 1,103,684 units produced
Fiat Uno (1994–2002, Bielsko-Biała and Tychy), 173,382 units produced
Fiat Seicento (1998–2010, Tychy), 1,328,973 units produced
Fiat Siena (1997–2001, Bielsko-Biała and Tychy)
Fiat Palio Weekend (1998–2004, Bielsko-Biała and Tychy).
Fiat Nuova Panda (2003–2012), 2,168,491 units produced
Ford Ka II (2008–2016)

Gallery

Car manufacturers of Poland
Motor vehicle assembly plants in Poland
Bielsko-Biała
Vehicle manufacturing companies disestablished in 1992
1992 disestablishments in Poland
Defunct manufacturing companies of Poland